Wanted is a comic book limited series created by writer Mark Millar and artist J. G. Jones. It was published by Top Cow in 2003 and 2004 as part of Millarworld. It features an amoral protagonist who discovers he is the heir to a career as a supervillain assassin in a world where such villains have secretly taken control of the planet. The Sunday Times dubbed the title "the Watchmen for super-villains."

A film adaptation, very loosely based on the comic, was released in 2008.

Publication history
As with Superman: Red Son, Millar claims that the concept for the series occurred to him when he was a child. In this case, it came to him after his brother told him that there were no superheroes anymore because they had all disappeared after a great war with their respective supervillains.

Plot
Wesley Gibson is a loser cubicle rat who is abused by almost everyone in his life, including his  boss, a local gang, his unfaithful girlfriend, and his best friend with whom his girlfriend is having an affair. Wesley was raised by his pacifist mother after they were abandoned by his father, causing him to grow up into a wimp. All this changes when he is visited by the Fox, an assassin who shoots everyone in a sandwich shop before revealing herself to be a member of the Fraternity, a powerful organization of supervillains that rules the world. So long as they maintain secrecy, they are able to commit any crime without any consequences. The Fraternity wishes to recruit Wesley to replace his father, a supervillain known as the Killer, who was killed by an unknown assassin.

The Fox introduces Wesley to Professor Solomon Selzer, a brilliant mad scientist and leader of the North and South American chapter of the Fraternity. The Professor helps Wesley realize his powers by provoking him into shooting the wings off flies. The Professor explains that a long time ago, the world was overrun by both superheroes and supervillains. Tired of being repeatedly defeated and jailed, the supervillains joined together and staged a revolution that Wesley's father was a part of. After a long, bloody war, the superheroes were defeated. Using magic and advanced technology, the newly formed Fraternity was able to erase the world's memories of superheroes and supervillains. All that remained were faint, inaccurate memories, which were the cause of superhero comic books and other media. Many of the surviving heroes now believed themselves to be actors who had played superheroes.

The Professor also explains to Wesley that Fox and his father had once worked for Mr. Rictus, who controlled the Australian chapter of the Fraternity. When Rictus visits the Professor's headquarters, Fox implies that she and the Killer left Rictus' chapter because he had been harming children.

The Fraternity begins training Wesley to use his newfound powers. The training focuses on not just his physical skills but on his personality. He is desensitized to violence and eventually learns to enjoy it. He is told to commit random acts of violence before undertaking acts of revenge on anyone who even slightly wronged him. He soon becomes a full-fledged Fraternity member, accompanying them on raids of alternate universes and other missions.

Wesley is assigned to be the Professor's personal bodyguard during a Fraternity convention in which the leaders of the Fraternity's five chapters will meet. The five leaders are the Professor, Mr. Rictus, Adam-One, the Future, and the Emperor. Here, he learns that Rictus and the Future had long wanted to end the Fraternity's policy of secrecy and rule the world openly. The Professor, Adam-One, and the Emperor favored secrecy for supervillains in order to get "the loot without the leg-breaking" and avoid gaining the attention of the larger multiverse, and have always managed to outvote Rictus and the Future. Though it seems that the Emperor is about to switch sides, the Professor subtly manipulates him to vote in favor of secrecy yet again.

After the meeting, the Professor leaves in a limo hoping to pick up a child prostitute. However, his driver is actually being impersonated by Shithead, Rictus's right-hand man, and the Professor is murdered by him. Rictus and Future's factions of the Fraternity begin a revolt against the other three. With most of the Professor's supervillains killed, Wesley and Fox must fight off the rival factions on their own. They manage to kill off many of the rebel supervillains, including the Future. This culminates in an attack on their own headquarters, occupied by Rictus and his gang. Defeating Rictus and deflecting a bullet through his throat, Wesley demands to know who killed his father but Rictus refuses to answer (or is simply unable to) before he dies. A figure steps out of the shadows revealing himself to be Wesley's father, the original Killer. The Killer reveals that he and Fox left Rictus's chapter not because they objected to harming children but because they knew of his planned revolt. The Killer also says that his skills have been deteriorating with age and he does not want to be killed by anyone inferior to him. After Wesley's training, the Killer believes that he is the only one worthy of ending his life and orders Wesley to put a bullet through his head. Afterwards, Wesley indicates that he wants to return to his former life and stop being a super villain. However, he reveals to Fox shortly after that he was just joking, and they go off to plan another heist. The comic ends with Wesley calling out the audience about their "pathetic" lives, and stating: "This is my face while I'm fucking you in the ass."

Main characters

The American Fraternity
The Killer (II) - Wesley Gibson, the protagonist of the series.
The Fox - Wesley's mentor and lover. According to her, Fox has been a criminal since she was fourteen years old.
The Professor - Solomon Seltzer, mad scientist, has dominion over one fifth of the Earth. A "Level 9" intelligence, the Professor's motivation for crime is to fund his scientific research. Killed by Shithead.
The Killer (I) - Hedonist and lover of death. Wesley's father, who fakes his own assassination to set the stage for Wesley to take over his role as The Killer and ultimately end his life for him. Killed by his son, Wesley Gibson.
The Doll-Master - Technological mastermind, specializing in toy-shaped weapons and robotics; will kill innocents but will not swear in front of children. Keeps his criminal career a secret from his family.
Fuckwit - A clone of a superhero. He is extremely strong and able to fly. However, he also has Down syndrome and can only understand a statement that is the opposite of what the speaker intends to say. However, he later begins to show signs of speaking and understanding normally. He is also vulnerable to a certain form of radiation. He has a childlike personality; according to the Wanted Dossier, he is "friendly, loyal, and loves you unconditionally."
Sucker - An extraterrestrial capable of temporarily stealing the powers of other superpowered beings. He betrays the Professor and joins Mr. Rictus' coup. He is killed when his 24-hour limit was drained while flying.
Imp - A reality-manipulating creature from a seven-dimensional world. He is thousands of years old but only an infant by the standards of his people, sneaking into the Wanted dimension while his parents are away. The Wanted Dossier states that he once brought buildings to life and made them fight each other and briefly turned America into a marshmallow paradise. Killed by Sucker.

The Australian Fraternity
Mr. Rictus - Rictus is a regular human with severely disfiguring burns, leaving his face locked in a rictus grin. The accident also left him with no moral compass, resulting in criminal insanity that brought him into the elite of the villains' Fraternity. His displeasure over receiving control of Australia when the world was divided, as well as his impatience for acting in secrecy, drives the events of the story.  
Shithead - A creature made of the feces of the 666 most evil people in the world, including Adolf Hitler, Ed Gein and Jeffrey Dahmer. 
Deadly Nightshade - A plant-manipulator. She is having an affair with Imp, a member of  the Fraternity's American chapter. According to the Wanted Dossier, this is extremely dangerous because of tensions between their two chapters as well as the possibility that the Imp might destroy reality in a pleasure-induced loss of control.

The Council of Five
The Council of Five is made up of the leaders from the five different chapters of the Fraternity. They meet once a year to vote on various issues.
The Professor controls North and South America.
Adam-One, the world's oldest man, took Africa. He has apparently outlived several of his own children. He supports keeping the Fraternity a secret from the world.
Mr. Rictus, has Australia.
The Future, a savage Nazi time-displaced criminal, got Europe. Hopes to begin a new Holocaust. He is willing to tolerate Asians and Africans so long as he is able to kill Jews. He supports Rictus' idea of going public. Killed by Wesley Gibson.
The Emperor (aka Ching-Sang), a Chinese crime lord, took control of Asia. Supports the Professor but is having doubts.

Other Fraternity members
The following characters are Fraternity members whose chapter affiliations are not specified.
The Puzzler - Has a costume designed to resemble a crossword puzzle. 
Johnny Two-dicks: A cowardly pharmacist with a thirteen-inch sentient penis that is a criminal mastermind. He lacks the courage to defy its orders. Two-dicks joins Rictus' rebellion. 
The Frightener: A supervillain who creates "psychic viruses".  Killed by Wesley Gibson.
The Avian: A bird-themed supervillain. Wesley's mother was his social worker and the two dated before she met Wesley's father.

Collected editions
The complete limited series, along with the Wanted: Dossier (which includes additional and "behind-the-scenes" material on the series), has been collected in a single volume as both a softcover and a hardcover.

Film

A film very loosely based on the comic was released in June 2008. It was directed by Timur Bekmambetov and starred  James McAvoy, Angelina Jolie and Morgan Freeman. The film focuses on a league of self-righteous assassins rather than super-villains. Mark Millar himself hinted at a sequel closer to the plot of the original comic and featuring The Killer's costume.

References

External links
Official website

2003 comics debuts
Comics by Mark Millar
Image Comics limited series
Widescreen comics
American comics adapted into films
Comics adapted into video games
Superhero comics